The 1998 WNBA season was the second for the Los Angeles Sparks. The Sparks missed out of the playoffs for the second consecutive season. It would be the last season they missed the playoffs until the 2007 season.

Offseason

WNBA Draft

Trades

Regular season

Season standings

Season schedule

Player stats

References

External links
Sparks on Basketball Reference

Los Angeles Sparks seasons
Los Angeles
Los Angeles Sparks